Jan Fridegård, born Johan Fridolf "Fride" Johansson, (14 June 1897 – 8 September 1968) was a Swedish writer of the proletarian school. Fridegård wrote a trilogy of novels about the Viking Era in Sweden : Trägudars land (1940; translated 1989 as Land of Wooden Gods), Gryningsfolket (1944; translated 1990 as People of the Dawn) and Offerrök (trans. 1991 as Sacrificial Smoke).

Bibliography

1931 – Den svarta lutan
1933 – 
1935 – 
1936 – Barmhärtighet
1936 – Tack för himlastegen
1937 – Offer
1938 – 
1939 – Statister (bok)|Statister
1940 – 
1941 – 
1942 – Här är min hand
1944 – 
1944 – Kvarnbudet
1947 – Fäderna:stenåldern
1948 – Johan From, Lars Hård och andra
1949 – 
1950 – Kvinnoträdet
1951 – Lars Hård går vidare
1952 – Johan Vallareman och andra sagor
1952 – 
1953 – Vägen heter smal
1954 – Sommarorgel
1955 – 
1955 – Lyktgubbarna
1956 – Flyttfåglarna
1956 – From och Hård
1957 – Arvtagarna
1958 – En bland eder
1959 – Muren
1959 – Svensk soldat
1960 – Soldathustrun
1961 – Mot öster - soldat!
1962 – Soldatens kärlek
1963 – Hemkomsten
1963 – Den gåtfulla vägen
1964 – På oxens horn
1965 – Lättingen
1965 – Noveller
1966 – Det kortaste strået
1967 – Tre stigar

Posthumous releases
1968 – Hallonflickan
1971 – Den blå dragonen. Självbiografiska berättelser
1973 – Ängslyckan och andra berättelser

References

1897 births
1968 deaths
People from Enköping Municipality
Swedish male writers
Swedish historical novelists
Writers of historical fiction set in the Middle Ages
Dobloug Prize winners
Burials at Uppsala old cemetery